"Payphone" is a song by American pop rock band Maroon 5 featuring American rapper Wiz Khalifa. It was released on April 16, 2012, as the lead single from their fourth studio album, Overexposed (2012). The song was written by Adam Levine, Khalifa, Ammar Malik, producers Benny Blanco and Shellback, and additional producer Robopop. The song is a pop ballad and describes a romance that ended abruptly. It has received favorable reviews from music critics, who praised the catchy melody and named it "a radio success", but some others dismissed its title and Khalifa's appearance.

The official music video was directed by Samuel Bayer, and finds Levine taking down some bank robbers and attempting to become the "hero" in a hail of bullets as he makes his escape, steals a gun from a robber, and then gets mistaken for one. Because of this, he must escape from a fleet of policemen, which he does with ease.  The video was positively received from critics, who considered it an enjoyable mini-action film. The video was nominated for an MTV Video Music Award for Best Pop Video, but lost out to "What Makes You Beautiful" by One Direction. In July 2012, "Payphone" was named Song of the Summer for 2012 by Idolator.

On the Billboard Hot 100, the song debuted at the number three spot before peaking at number two. The song sold 493,000 copies in its first week, becoming the best sales week for a digital song by a group and also the eleventh-best sales week overall. It peaked at number one in Canada for eight consecutive weeks. It also topped the charts in the United Kingdom, making it the band's first-ever single to do so. "Payphone" was the world's fifth best-selling single of 2012 with 9.5 million copies sold.

Background

The song was written by Maroon 5's lead singer Adam Levine, along with Ammar Malik, Robopop, Benny Blanco, Shellback, and Wiz Khalifa, while production, programming, additional bass, keys, acoustic guitars and background vocals were provided by Shellback and Blanco. Levine, Blanco, Shellback, and Malik also wrote the band's previous single "Moves Like Jagger". The writing process started when Malik and Robopop constructed a piano line and demo track that Blanco compiled into a proper melody. They gave it to Levine, who wrote the lyrics. Blanco also wanted to throw a wrench into the Maroon 5 works by adding hip-hop flavor to its sound, "I love when things don't make sense, like, 'Holy fuck!' You don't hear him on the song at all. I like when bands dip into a whole different genre." For this, he commissioned Wiz Khalifa (whose singles "No Sleep" and the then-upcoming "Work Hard, Play Hard", Blanco has produced) to write and rap a verse on "Payphone". In an interview with Rolling Stone, Blanco told that five minutes before Khalifa arrived at the studio, he prepared "the sound beds for the finger snap-driven portion of the jam". However, producer Max Martin, who was the executive producer of Overexposed, adjusted the chorus, because he felt it should be a "little different".

Shellback recorded "Payphone" at Conway Studios in Los Angeles alongside Noah "Mailbox" Pasovoy, while Eric Eylands served as the assistant engineer. John Hanes mixed the song at Mixstar Studios in Virginia Beach and Phil Seaford was the mixing assistant. Jeremy "Jbogs" Levin and David "D Silb" Silberstein served as production coordinators. Khalifa appears as courtesy of Rostrum Records. "Payphone" was released as a lead single from Overexposed on April 16, 2012, in the United States. On April 17, it was digitally released in most territories. A&M Octone Records serviced the song to contemporary hit radio in the US on April 24. A remix version of "Payphone" by The Sound of Arrows premiered execlusively on PopCrush website on May 22, 2012. A CD single containing the album version of the song together with a Thomas Penton/Barry Huffine remix was released on June 8 in Germany.

Composition
"Payphone" is a pop and R&B song that contains a hip hop beat and piano hook. It has a duration of 3 minutes and 51 seconds. Its instrumentation consists of funk guitars, bass and synths. "Payphone" is written in the key of B major (recorded in B major), in common time, with a tempo of 110 beats per minute.  Levine's vocal range spans from the low note of G♯3 to the high note of B4. Thomas Chau from AOL Radio Blog called the song "mellow" and compared it to the band's previous singles "She Will Be Loved" (2004) and "Won't Go Home Without You" (2007).

On the chorus, he sings: "I’m at a payphone trying to call home / All of my change I spent on you / Where have the times gone? / Baby, it’s all wrong / Where are the plans we made for two?". Because this is their second song with profanity, "Shit" and "fucking" are intact, but have been replaced with "it" and "stupid" in the song's clean version. The clean version censors Wiz Khalifa's cursing as well. When Khalifa serves his verse, his rhymes don't speak of his love life, but rather his "haters": "I'll be out spending all this money while you sittin' 'round wondering why it wasn't you who came up from nothin' / Made it from the bottom now when you see me I'm stunnin'." An alternate version has these lyrics replaced with "Now baby don't hang up, so I can tell you what you need to know / Baby I'm begging you just please don't go, so I can tell you what you need to know."

Critical reception
"Payphone" received positive reviews from music critics. Crystal Bell from Huffington Post called it "definitely one of the band's most pop-y singles to date." Robbie Daw from Idolator wrote that the song is "extremely Top 40-friendly." Melinda Newman from HitFix wrote that the song "is a straight-ahead pop ditty, that, like everything else these days, seems to take a page from Bruno Mars' "Grenade" for its shiny, military-like precise beat that still manages to sound convincingly warm. It's melodic and catchy, and but not overly aggressive. Rick Florino of Artist Direct commented that the song "merges one of the band's biggest hooks with clever lines." Robert Copsey from Digital Spy described it as "a shining example as an addictive head-nodder."

Chris Payne from Billboard wrote that "The pop/R&B fling is far from a classic Maroon 5 cut, yet it serves as a testament to the band's continued rebranding and a reminder of how much the airwaves have changed since 'This Love' hit in 2004." Another mixed review came from Entertainment Weekly's Marc Snetiker, who commented that "it’s pretty easy to replace the band’s signature electronic meta-funk with any of the boy band’s impish members, for example One Direction." However, he concluded that "it's catchy, infectious, and overwhelmingly mellow." Fraser McAlpine from BBC Music criticized his voice, writing: "Adam Levine fires up that nasal yelp as soon as the song begins, and does not let up until the fadeout."  McAlpine also wrote that "Wiz Khalifa  gets more space at the front of the stage than the rest of his band do."

Adam Markovitz from Entertainment Weekly concluded:
"Payphone is an alchemy of elemental pop-rock building blocks that conjures virile longing in the same corny-graceful way as past M5 hits like She Will Be Loved. Levine's voice soars, the piano and guitar hit notes of bitter nostalgia, and for once the words' hurt feels real. And whether by Pro-Tooled magic or old-fashioned sweat, the song also sounds remarkably like it was recorded in a studio by musicians who actually came together to play as a band — even if one of them was only dropping by on his way to the soundstage."

The song ranked number 46 on Rolling Stones list of the 50 best songs of 2012.

Chart performance
In the United States, the song debuted on the Pop Songs chart at number 21, making it the highest-charting debut by a group since 'N Sync's "Pop" debuted at the same position in June 2001. "Payphone" peaked at number one on the Billboard's Pop Songs chart, becoming their fourth number one. On Pop Songs, the group makes it to back-to-back toppers, as its last entry, "Moves Like Jagger," featuring Christina Aguilera, reigned for six weeks beginning in October. The band had likewise led consecutively with its first two number ones, "This Love" (three weeks) and "She Will Be Loved" (four) in 2004. Wiz Khalifa, featured on the pop edit of "Payphone," scores his first Mainstream Top 40 number one. On the Adult Pop Songs chart, "Payphone" debuted at number 17, the highest-ever debut by a group and the third-highest overall. It also topped the Adult Pop Songs, becoming their fifth leader. On Adult Pop Songs, Maroon 5 - whose number one ledger on the list includes its four Pop Songs leaders plus 2010's "Misery" - ties Nickelback for the most commanding titles among groups in the chart's 16-year history.

"Payphone" sold 493,000 digital downloads in its first week and subsequently debuted at number one on the Hot Digital Songs chart, the best sales week ever for a digital song by a group, surpassing The Black Eyed Peas' "Boom Boom Pow", which topped the chart with sales of 464,000 units in April 2009. It is also the eighth-best sales week overall since Nielsen SoundScan began tracking digital downloads in 2003. The song debuted at number three on the Billboard Hot 100. It failed to reach number one, peaking at number two on that chart for six non-consecutive weeks, being blocked from the top spot by Gotye's "Somebody That I Used to Know" and Carly Rae Jepsen's smash hit of the summer, "Call Me Maybe". On its 18th week in the top ten, "Payphone" dropped to number  seven on the Billboard Hot 100, making it the first time the song was not a part of the top five. It also spent its first 19 weeks in the top ten.  Over 5 million copies of the song had been sold in the United States by March 2013, and as of June 2014, it has sold 5,510,000 copies in the US.

On the Canadian Hot 100 chart, the song debuted at number 2, for the issue dated May 5, 2012. The following week, the song fell to number 3, where it remained for a further week. The following week, the song climbed to number 2 and on the chart issue dated June 2, 2012, the song topped the Canadian charts. For the following seven weeks, the song remained at the top, spending a total of eight weeks at the top.

In the United Kingdom, "Payphone" debuted at number one on the UK Singles Chart. It remained at the top of the chart for two non-consecutive weeks and became both Maroon 5's and Wiz Khalifa's first chart-topping song in Britain. It sold over 141,000 copies, which marks the third week in a row that the number one single broke the 100,000 barrier after Gary Barlow and Cheryl Cole. According to the Official Charts Company, the song sold 725,000 copies in the United Kingdom in 2012, becoming Britain's ninth best-selling single of that year. "Payphone" had sold 68,000 digital copies in Italy.

Music video

The music video for "Payphone" directed by Samuel Bayer, was shot on April 17 and 18, 2012. Lead singer, Adam Levine was spotted shooting the video, making a call from a Los Angeles phone booth, fleeing from the police with model Bregje Heinen and speeding away in a classic sports car. It is revealed in the video for Levine's role is a bank worker, he said: "I work at a bank; I have no self-confidence. It's gonna be a very difficult role for me to play because I'm a cocky motherf**ker." The video for "Payphone" premiered on May 9, 2012 on E! and was released on Vevo on May 10. It was reportedly similar to The Matrix, The Dark Knight and Die Hard, and the high-action FPS video game, Payday: The Heist. The car used in the video, a custom 1967 Shelby Cobra, was a kit-car hand built by car enthusiast Jim Fletcher from Fresno, CA.

Synopsis
The video begins with a flashforward that starts with a beleaguered Levine torching his ride and dialing a telephone number at a payphone. Another typical day at a Las Vegas (seen from the decals on the police cars) bank for Levine is shown next, which turns into chaos when some bandits enter and take charge (some of the bank robbers are played by the other members of the band: guitarist James Valentine, drummer Matt Flynn, bassist Mickey Madden and keyboardist, previously a touring Maroon 5 member, PJ Morton) – all of this happens while the song plays in the background. Levine grabs a gun from one of the robbers and threatens to get rid of them. He and his female co-worker named Sonya escape, though Levine is shot in the arm, but when some cops mistake him for one of the robbers, Levine tells Sonya to hide in a car and steals an AC Cobra 427 that belongs to Wiz Khalifa to get away from them. A car chase follows and when Levine is almost caught by the police, he steers the stolen convertible onto the wrong side of the road and causes a huge explosion, which destroys one of the police cars. When he finally reaches his destination in Los Angeles, he passes by a place where Khalifa, the owner of the car, performed his rap earlier. After Levine gets out of the convertible, it also explodes and he enters a booth, injured, with the titular payphone, probably to call for help (it is also likely that he is calling Sonya) – this connects to the beginning of the video.

Reception
Natalie Finn of E! News gave a positive review for the video, writing that "Adam Levine looks just as good as a buttoned-up bank employee as he does as a dirty, wounded fugitive trying to outrun the cops". Becky Bain of Idolator wrote that "The clip is an enjoyable mini-blockbuster, but it’s still missing one important ingredient: Adam Levine without a shirt." Rebecca Ford of The Hollywood Reporter gave a mixed review, writing: "Although it's fun to see such a big-budget clip from the band, the story line doesn't make complete sense. Since Levine's character didn't rob the bank, why does he keep running from the cops? And why does he leave the pretty lady behind?". Kyle Anderson of Entertainment Weekly, wrote that "There's a little bit of John McClane in Levine's performance–could he have a future as an action star".

The video was nominated for an MTV VMA for Best Pop Video.

Lyric video
A lyric video for the song premiered on April 16, 2012 on Maroon 5's Vevo channel. The clip is in an animated graphic novel style, drawn in panels. The clip shows the main character, presumably frontman Levine, looking back on his relationship and heroically fighting monsters, rescuing old women from muggers, etc. Towards the end, Wiz Khalifa appears in a hoodie, acting as Levine's crime-fighting sidekick.

Live performances
On April 16, 2012, Maroon 5 and Wiz Khalifa performed "Payphone" for the first time on The Voice, a reality talent show, in which lead singer Adam Levine is one of the coaches. "Payphone" was also performed, for the first time at a proper Maroon 5 concert, during the band's special performance for the grand opening of the Microsoft Store in Palo Alto, California, on April 21, 2012. Adam Levine sang the lines from the alternative version of the song, without the rap, released officially on April 18, 2012, just two days after its world premiere on The Voice and also on iTunes: "Now, baby, don't hang up / So I can tell you what you need to know / Baby, I'm begging you / Just, please, don't go / So I can tell you what you need to know." in lieu of Khalifa's rap verse. On May 12, 2012, Maroon 5 and Khalifa performed "Payphone" together at the 2012 edition of Wango Tango. In June 2012, the band performed "Payphone" (with a medley of their song "Moves Like Jagger"), on The Voice UK and Germany's Next Top Model. On June 5, 2012, Maroon 5 performed "Payphone" on the French reality talk show, Le Grand Journal in Paris, France. The band performed the song live on Late Night with Jimmy Fallon (June 28), and The Today Show (June 29), where they also played their songs including "One More Night", "Moves Like Jagger" and "Harder to Breathe". The band continued to played "Payphone" in various concert tours such as the Overexposed Tour and the 2013 Honda Civic Tour, respectively.

Awards and nominations

Track listings

Credits and personnel 

Maroon 5
 Adam Levine – lead vocals, songwriting
 Mickey Madden - bass guitar
 James Valentine - lead and rhythm guitar, programming
 PJ Morton - keyboards, synthesizers, backing vocals
 Matt Flynn –  drums
Session musicians/songwriters
 Wiz Khalifa – featured guest artist, rap verse, songwriting
 Dan Omelio (Robopop) – songwriter, additional production, additional keyboards, synthesizers and guitars
 Shellback – songwriter, producer, recording, programming, additional bass, keyboards, synthesizers, acoustic guitar, backing vocals
 Benjamin Levin (Benny Blanco) – songwriter, producer, engineer, programming, additional keyboards and synths
 Ammar Malik – songwriter
Production
 Bradford Smith – engineer
 Chris Sclafani – engineer
 Jonathan Mann – engineer
 Noah "Mailbox" Passovoy – recording
 Eric Eylands – assistant engineer
 John Hanes – mix engineer
 Phil Seaford – assistant mix engineer
 Andrew "Muffman" Luftman – assistant engineer
 Scott "Yarmov" Yarmovsky – assistant engineer
 Sam "Såklart" Holland – assistant engineer
 Jeremy "Jboogs" Levin – production coordination
 David "D Silb" Silberstein – production coordination

Recording
Engineered at Record Plant Studios, Los Angeles, California, at Downtown Studios, New York City, New York, and at Jon Mann Studios, Reston, Virginia
Recorded at Conway Studios, Los Angeles, California
Mixed at MixStar Studios, Virginia Beach, Virginia

Charts

Weekly charts

Year-end charts

Decade-end charts

Certifications and sales

Radio and release history

Precision Tunes version

In April 2012, a cover of the song by Precision Tunes was released for digital download. Due to the Maroon 5 original not being available for purchase in the United Kingdom at the time, with the release date for their version set in June 2012, the Precision Tunes version of the song was met with a large influx of downloads there. Downloads of the cover caused this version of "Payphone" to debut at number 83 on the UK Singles Chart. The following week, it hit the top ten of the chart, peaking at number nine.

Track listing

Charts

Release history

References

2010s ballads
2012 singles
Maroon 5 songs
Wiz Khalifa songs
Pop ballads
Rock ballads
Songs written by Benny Blanco
Songs written by Adam Levine
Songs written by Shellback (record producer)
Song recordings produced by Benny Blanco
Song recordings produced by Shellback (record producer)
Songs about telephones
Songs about telephone calls
Canadian Hot 100 number-one singles
Number-one singles in Hungary
Number-one singles in Italy
Number-one singles in Scotland
Record Report Pop Rock General number-one singles
UK Singles Chart number-one singles
Music videos directed by Samuel Bayer
Songs written by Ammar Malik
Songs written by Robopop
Songs written by Wiz Khalifa
2012 songs
Animated music videos
A&M Octone Records singles

simple:Payphone